Ed Comeau is a Canadian and head coach of the Georgia Swarm of the NLL. He is the former head coach of the Orlando Titans, until they folded in 2010.

Comeau began his NLL coaching career with the Toronto Rock, as an assistant coach under the legendary Les Bartley. The Rock won four NLL Championships under Bartley (1999, 2000, 2002, and 2003 NLL season).

In November 2003, Bartley stepped down due to his battle with colon cancer, and Comeau was promoted to interim head coach. However, less than four months later, after a 2-4 start, both Comeau and interim GM Derek Keenan were fired by the Rock, replaced by Terry Sanderson.

In 2004, Comeau joined the Rochester Knighthawks as an assistant coach, and was then promoted to head coach at the beginning of the 2006 season, replacing Paul Day. Rochester finished with a 9-7 record, second in the Eastern division, but were eliminated from the playoffs by the Buffalo Bandits in the division finals.

In 2007, the Knighthawks began the season 2-2, and then won a franchise record 12 straight games to finish the season with a 14-2 mark, tied for the best record since the NLL went to a 16-game schedule. They continued the winning streak in the postseason, defeating Toronto, Buffalo, and finally Arizona to win their first championship since 1997. After the season, Comeau was named the winner of the Les Bartley Award for coach of the year.

After a disappointing 2008 season in which the Knighthawks missed the playoffs for the first time in franchise history, Comeau announced that he would not be returning to the Knighthawks. Only three days later, Comeau was announced as the new head coach of the New York Titans, after former coach Adam Mueller announced his retirement.  The same year, he achieved a master’s degree in sports coaching from the United States Sports Academy.

References

Awards

National Lacrosse League coaches
Living people
National Lacrosse League major award winners
Sportspeople from Hamilton, Ontario
Toronto Rock coaches
Rochester Knighthawks coaches
Georgia Swarm coaches
Year of birth missing (living people)